The Scent of Rain in the Balkans is a historical novel written by Gordana Kuić. The novel was published in 1986, becoming an instant bestseller. It centers on the Salom family, most notably five sisters — Buka, Nina, Klara, Blanki and Riki. The novel was inspired by Kuić's mother Blanki Levi and her sisters. The Scent of Rain in the Balkans follows the destinies of, not only Jews, but also Orthodox, Bosniaks and Catholics during two major historical events — World War I and World War II.

In his review of the novel, David Albahari wrote: 

The Scent of Rain in the Balkans has been adapted into a ballet, a play and a television series.

Plot 
The novel describes the historic period in the Balkans from the beginning of World War I in 1914, to the end of World War II in 1945 through the lives and destinies of the Saloms, a Sephardic Jewish family from Sarajevo. The leading characters are the five courageous Salom sisters whose struggle to fulfil personal desires and aspirations run contrary to the strict conventions of the multicultural and religious societies — Bosnian Jew, Muslim, Orthodox and Catholic — of the time, living side by side in the small town of Sarajevo.

Characters

The Salom family 
 Leon Salom, the father of the family
 Estera Salom, the mother of the family
 Laura "Buka" Salom, later Laura Papo, the eldest daughter of Leon and Estera
 Nina Salom, later Nina Ignjatić, the second daughter of Leon and Estera
 Klara Salom, later Klara Valić, the third daughter of Leon and Estera
 Isak "Atleta" Salom, the eldest son of Leon and Estera
 Blanka "Blanki" Salom, later Branka Korać, the fourth daughter of Leon and Estera
 Rifketa "Riki" Salom, the fifth and the youngest daughter of Leon and Estera, who becomes a successful ballerina
 Elijas Salom, the second son and the youngest child of Leon and Estera
 Nona Salom, one of the aunts of the Salom children and a highly respected member of the family

Serbian characters 
 Marko Korać, a Mostar–born Blanki's childhood crush and eventually her husband
 Škoro "Ignjo" Ignjatić, Danijel's friend and Nina's husband
 Miloš Ranković, Riki's mentor and lover for a while
 Dušan, a journalist from Belgrade who fancies Riki
 Sanda Jovanović, Riki's friend from Belgrade of Jewish heritage
 Nena Ranković, Miloš's wife
 Vlada Stefanović, a teacher in the village where Riki hides
 Danica Stefanović, Vlada's wife
 Vera Korać, Blanki and Marko's daughter
 Risto Korać, one of Marko's brothers
 Pero Korać, one of Marko's brothers
 Saveta Primorac, Marko's sister
 Jovo Primorac, Saveta's husband
 Ana Primorac, one of two Saveta and Jovo's daughters
 Jelena Primorac, one of two Saveta and Jovo's daughters
 Toma, a Serbian peasant who shelters Riki
 Spasenija, Toma's wife
 Mrs. Ninković, a frequent shopper in Nina's hat boutique who likes gossiping

Jewish characters 
 Danijel Papo, Buka's husband and the father of her sons Leon and Koki
 Zdenka Vajs, an Ashkenazi Jew, Atleta's wife
 Leon Papo, Buka and Danijel's elder son, named after his maternal grandfather
 Barkohba "Koki" Papo, Buka and Danijel's younger son

Other characters 
 Ivo Valić, a Catholic Croat, Klara's husband
 Didi Valić, Klara and Ivo's daughter
 Pol Valić, Klara and Ivo's son
 Cliff Morton, an American soldier and Didi's husband
 Grethen, a rich Austrian girl and Blanki's good friend from school
 Carl Raimund, the agent of a ballet school from Vienna
 Dragu, a ballet dancer and Riki's friend
 Mr. Panzini, an Italian rich man who fancies Blanki
 Sister Agata, a nun in the convent where Buka dies

Structure and language 
The Scent of Rain in the Balkans is written in Serbo-Croatian language, with some parts in Ladino, the language of Sephardi. It is divided in thirteen parts — 28 June 1914 (28. jun 1914), A Flight to Unknown (Let u nepoznato), Linden, the Tree of Old Slavs (Lipa, drvo starih Slovena), Time for Decisions (Vreme za odluke), Toboggan (Tobogan), When a Day Turns Cold and the Shadows Are Gone (Kad zahladni dan i senke odu), The End of One Age (Kraj jednog vremena), A Critic Point (Kritična tačka), Runaways (Bežanja), Paper Jesters (Papirni pajaci), A New Life (Novi život), Lasting (Trajanje) and Epilogue (Epilog).

Awards 
 1986 — Association of Jewish Communities in Yugoslavia Award for Novel of the Year

Adaptations 
In 1992, ballet by Croatian composer Igor Kuljerić The Scent of Rain in the Balkans – a Ballet for Riki premiered in Sarajevo, and then a week after in Belgrade. In 2009, screenwriter Nebojša Romčević wrote a stage adaptation of the novel that premiered on 12 April 2009 in the Madlenianum Opera and Theatre, starring Sloboda Mićalović and Vuk Kostić. In 2010, Ljubiša Samardžić directed the television adaptation of the novel, which was shown on the RTS.

References

External links 
 Official Website of Gordana Kuić

1986 novels
Historical novels
Novels set in Yugoslavia
Serbian novels
Novels set in Serbia
Fictional Yugoslav people
Fictional Bosnian people 
Fictional Serbian Jews                                                           
Fictional Jews
Bosnia and Herzegovina in fiction
Jewish Bosnian history
Judaeo-Spanish literature